Parenti is an Italian surname. Notable people with the surname include:

Andrea Parenti (born 1965), Italian archer
Christian Parenti, American journalist
Edward Parenti (born 1971), Canadian former competitive swimmer 
Giovanni Parenti O.F.M. (died 1250), Italian Friar Minor and successor of St. Francis of Assisi as head of the Order
Irene Parenti Duclos, academic nickname Lala Cicicena (1754–1795), Italian painter and poet
Lynne R. Parenti (born 1954), American ichthyologist
Michael Parenti (born 1933), American political writer
Neri Parenti (born 1950), Italian film director
Norma Pratelli Parenti (1921–1944), Italian partisan
Rino Parenti (1895–1953), Italian fascist leader
Tony Parenti (1900–1972), American jazz clarinettist and saxophonist 

Italian-language surnames